, (Musical Perspectives) (known as SYR5) is a studio album by Kim Gordon, DJ Olive and Ikue Mori. It was released on August 29, 2000 by record label SYR, and was the fifth entry in the SYR series, despite not featuring Sonic Youth as a whole.

Background 

Following the tradition of having the liner notes of SYR releases written in foreign languages, the notes for SYR5 were written in Japanese. The Japanese title means "Musical Perspectives", a name that also appears in different languages on other SYR releases.

It was recorded at Tribeca Recording Center, which is Gordon's preferred name for Sonic Youth's Echo Canyon studios.

AllMusic described the music as "ultra-abstract and mood-driven, filling the listening space with a dark ambience constructed by Olive's incredibly resonant choice of samples and Mori's carefully tweaked bleeps."

Track listing

Critical reception 

AllMusic noted that while the lyrics "dance the line between abstract poetry and frustrating downtown pretentiousness", this is made up for by "the utterly weird and compelling soundscapes the group creates – a true headphone head trip." Pitchfork panned the album, giving it a grade of 3.2/10 and commenting, "This record leaves me sad and blank."

Personnel 

 Kim Gordon
 DJ Olive
 Ikue Mori

 Technical

 Jim O'Rourke – mixing
 Wharton Tiers – recording
 Steve Fallone – mastering
 Chris Habib – sleeve graphics

References

External links 

 
 

2000 albums
Sonic Youth
Sonic Youth Recordings albums